

List of the Colonial Heads of Upper Oubangui and the region becoming the Central African Republic

(Dates in italics indicate de facto continuation of office)

{| class="wikitable"
|- align=left
! width="18%" |Term
! width="35%" |Incumbent
! width="15%" |Notes
|- valign=top
|colspan="3"|French Suzerainty
|- valign=top bgcolor="#ffffec"
|10 February 1894 to 13 July 1894||Eugène Decazes, Director|| 
|-
|colspan="3"|Upper Oubangui (Haut-Oubangui)
|- valign=top bgcolor="#ffffec"
|13 July 1894 to 20 October 1894||Eugène Decazes, Commissioner|| 
|- valign=top bgcolor="#ffffec"
|20 October 1894 to 1897||Victor Liotard, Commissioner|| 
|- valign=top bgcolor="#ffffec"
|1897 to 1900||Victor Liotard, Lieutenant-Governor|| 
|- valign=top bgcolor="#ffffec"
|1900 to 29 December 1903||Adolphe Cureau, Lieutenant-Governor|| 
|-
|colspan="3"|Upper Oubangui (Oubangui-Chari)
|- valign=top bgcolor="#ffffec"
|29 December 1903 to May 1904||Adolphe Cureau, Lieutenant-Governor||valign=top|(contd.)
|- valign=top bgcolor="#ffffec"
|May 1904 to 22 August 1905||Alphonse Iaeck, acting Governor-Delegate|| 
|- valign=top bgcolor="#ffffec"
|22 August 1905 to 16 February 1906||Victor Emmanuel Merlet, acting Governor-Delegate|| 
|- valign=top bgcolor="#ffffec"
|16 February 1906 to 4 April 1906||Louis Paul Émile Lamy, Governor-Delegate|| 
|-
|colspan="3"|Oubangui-Chari-Tchad (constituent colony of Congo Français, renamed French Equatorial Africa in 1910)
|- valign=top bgcolor="#ffffec"
|April 4, 1906, to February 28, 1909||Émile Merwart, Lieutenant-Governor|| 
|- valign=top bgcolor="#ffffec"
|February 28, 1909, to August 5, 1910||Lucien Fourneau, acting Lieutenant-Governor|| 
|- valign=top bgcolor="#ffffec"
|August 5, 1910, to June 10, 1911||Paul Adam, acting Lieutenant-Governor|| 
|- valign=top bgcolor="#ffffec"
|June 10, 1911, to October 12, 1916||Frederic Estebe, Lieutenant-Governor|| 
|- valign=top bgcolor="#ffffec"
|October 12, 1916, to July 17, 1917||Victor Merlet, Lieutenant-Governor|| 
|- valign=top bgcolor="#ffffec"
|July 17, 1917, to 16 May 1919||Auguste Lamblin, acting Lieutenant-Governor|| 
|- valign=top bgcolor="#ffffec"
|May 16, 1919 to August 31, 1920||Auguste Lamblin, Lieutenant-Governor|| 
|-
|colspan="3"|Oubangui-Chari (Oubangui-Chari and Chad are separated)
|- valign=top bgcolor="#ffffec"
|August 31, 1920 to December 1921||Alphonse Diret, acting Lieutenant-Governor|| 
|- valign=top bgcolor="#ffffec"
|December 1921 to August 7, 1923||Auguste Lamblin, Lieutenant-Governor|| 
|- valign=top bgcolor="#ffffec"
|August 7, 1923 to November 1924||Pierre Frangois, acting Lieutenant-Governor|| 
|- valign=top bgcolor="#ffffec"
|November 1924 to July 1, 1926||Auguste Lamblin, Lieutenant-Governor|| 
|- valign=top bgcolor="#ffffec"
|July 1, 1926, to July 1928||Georges Prouteaux, acting Lieutenant-Governor|| 
|- valign=top bgcolor="#ffffec"
|July 1928 to October 22, 1929||Auguste Lamblin, Lieutenant-Governor|| 
|- valign=top bgcolor="#ffffec"
|October 22, 1929, to October 30, 1930||Georges Prouteaux, acting Lieutenant-Governor|| 
|- valign=top bgcolor="#ffffec"
|October 30, 1930, to March 8, 1933||Alphonse Deitte, Lieutenant-Governor|| 
|- valign=top bgcolor="#ffffec"
|March 8, 1933, to February 1934||Pierre Bonnefont, acting Lieutenant-Governor|| 
|- valign=top bgcolor="#ffffec"
|February 1934 to August 17, 1934||Alphonse Deitte, Lieutenant-Governor|| 
|- valign=top bgcolor="#ffffec"
|August 17, 1934 to May 21, 1935||Adolphe Deitte, Governor-Delegate|| 
|- valign=top bgcolor="#ffffec"
|May 21, 1935, to May 30, 1936||Richard Brunot, Governor-Delegate|| 
|- valign=top bgcolor="#ffffec"
|May 30, 1935, to October 24, 1936||Pierre Bonnefont, acting Governor-Delegate|| 
|- valign=top bgcolor="#ffffec"
|October 24, 1936, to March 28, 1939||Max Masson de Saint-Félix, Governor-Delegate|| 
|- valign=top bgcolor="#ffffec"
|March 28, 1939, to July 15, 1941||Pierre de Saint-Mart, acting Governor|| 
|- valign=top bgcolor="#ffffec"
|July 15, 1941 to May 30, 1942||Pierre de Saint-Mart, Governor|| 
|- valign=top bgcolor="#ffffec"
|May 30, 1942, to July 30, 1942||André Latrille, acting Governor|| 
|- valign=top bgcolor="#ffffec"
|July 30, 1942, to April 3, 1946||Henri Sautot, Governor|| 
|- valign=top bgcolor="#ffffec"
|April 3, 1946, to May 24, 1946||Jean Chalvet, Governor|| 
|- valign=top bgcolor="#ffffec"
|May 24, 1946, to October 1946||Henri Latour, acting Governor|| 
|-
| colspan="3"|French overseas territory
|- valign=top bgcolor="#ffffec"
|October 1946 to April 25, 1948||Jean Chalvet, Governor||valign=top|(contd.)
|- valign=top bgcolor="#ffffec"
|April 25, 1948, to December 1, 1948||Jean Mauberna, acting Governor|| 
|- valign=top bgcolor="#ffffec"
|December 1, 1948, to January 27, 1949||Auguste Even, acting Governor||valign=top|1st Term
|- valign=top bgcolor="#ffffec"
|January 27, 1949, to January 4, 1950||Pierre Delteil, Governor|| 
|- valign=top bgcolor="#ffffec"
|January 4, 1950, to March 1, 1950||Auguste Even, acting Governor||valign=top|2nd Term
|- valign=top bgcolor="#ffffec"
|March 1, 1950, to July 9, 1951||Ignace Colombani, Governor|| 
|- valign=top bgcolor="#ffffec"
|July 9, 1951, to October 19, 1951||Pierre Raynier, acting Governor|| 
|- valign=top bgcolor="#ffffec"
|October 19, 1951, to February 16, 1954||Aime Grimald, Governor|| 
|- valign=top bgcolor="#ffffec"
|February 16, 1954, to March 23, 1955||Louis Sanmarco, acting Governor|| 
|- valign=top bgcolor="#ffffec"
|<small>March 23, 1957 to January 29, 1958</small>||Louis Sanmarco, Governor|| 
|- valign=top bgcolor="#ffffec"
|January 29, 1958, to December 1, 1958||Paul Bordier, Governor|| 
|-valign=top
|Central African Republic||colspan="2"|autonomous|- valign=top bgcolor="#ffffec"
|December 1, 1958 to August 14, 1960||Paul Bordier, High Commissioner||valign=top|
|- valign=top
|August 14, 1960||colspan="2"|Independence as Central African Republic|}

For continuation after independence, see:'' Heads of State of the Central African Republic (and Central African Empire)

See also
Central African Republic
Heads of state of the Central African Republic (and Central African Empire)
Heads of government of the Central African Republic (and Central African Empire)
Lists of office-holders

References

Central Africa
Colonial heads